El Hadj Omar Bongo Ondimba (born Albert-Bernard Bongo; 30 December 1935 – 8 June 2009) was a Gabonese politician who was the second President of Gabon for 42 years, from 1967 until his death in 2009. Omar Bongo was promoted to key positions as a young official under Gabon's first President Léon M'ba in the 1960s, before being elected Vice-President in his own right in 1966. In 1967, he succeeded M'ba to become the second Gabon President, upon the latter's death.

Bongo headed the single-party regime of the Gabonese Democratic Party (PDG) until 1990, when, faced with public pressure, he was forced to introduce multi-party politics into Gabon. His political survival despite intense opposition to his rule in the early 1990s seemed to stem once again from consolidating power by bringing most of the major opposition leaders at the time to his side. The 1993 presidential election was extremely controversial but ended with his re-election then and the subsequent elections of 1998 and 2005. His respective parliamentary majorities increased and the opposition becoming more subdued with each succeeding election. After Cuban President Fidel Castro stepped down in February 2008, Bongo became the world's longest-ruling non-royal leader. He was one of the longest serving non-royal rulers since 1900.

Bongo was criticized for in effect having worked for himself, his family and local elites and not for Gabon and its people. For instance, French green politician Eva Joly claimed that during Bongo's long reign, despite an oil-led GDP per capita growth to one of the highest levels in Africa, Gabon built only 5 km of freeway a year and still had one of the world's highest infant mortality rates by the time of his death in 2009.

After Bongo's death in June 2009, his son Ali Bongo—who had long been assigned key ministerial responsibilities by his father—was elected to succeed him in August 2009.

Early life
The youngest of twelve siblings, Albert-Bernard Bongo was born on 30 December 1935 in Lewai (since renamed Bongoville), French Equatorial Africa, a town of the Haut-Ogooué province in what is now southeastern Gabon near the border with the Republic of the Congo. He was a member of the small Bateke ethnic group. He changed his name to El Hadj Omar Bongo when he converted to Islam in 1973. After completing his primary and secondary education in Brazzaville (then the capital of French Equatorial Africa), Bongo held a job at the Post and Telecommunications Public Services, before joining the French military where he served as a second lieutenant and then as a first lieutenant in the Air Force, in Brazzaville, Bangui and Fort Lamy (present-day N'djamena, Chad) successively, before being honorably discharged as captain.

Political career

Pre-Presidency
After Gabon's independence in 1960, Albert-Bernard Bongo began his political career, rapidly rising through a succession of positions under President Léon M'ba. Bongo campaigned for M. Sandoungout in Haut Ogooué in the 1961 parliamentary election, choosing not to run for election in his own right; Sandoungout was elected and became Minister of Health. Bongo worked at the Ministry of Foreign Affairs for a time, and he was named Assistant Director of the Presidential Cabinet in March 1962; he was named Director seven months later. In 1964, during the only coup attempt in Gabon's history, M'ba was kidnapped and Bongo was held in a military camp in Libreville, though M'ba was restored to power two days later.

On 24 September 1965, he was appointed as Presidential Representative and placed in charge of defense and coordination. He was then appointed Minister of Information and Tourism, initially on an interim basis, then formally holding the position in August 1966. M'ba, whose health was declining, appointed Bongo as Vice-President of Gabon on 12 November 1966. In the presidential election held on 19 March 1967, M'ba was re-elected as President and Bongo was elected as Vice-President during the same election. Bongo was in effective control of Gabon since November 1966 during President Léon M'ba's long illness.

Single-party rule

Bongo became President on 2 December 1967, following the death of M'ba four days earlier, and was installed by de Gaulle and influential French leaders. Aged 32, Bongo was Africa's fourth youngest president at the time, after captain  Michel Micombero of Burundi and sergeant Gnassingbé Eyadéma of Togo. In March 1968 Bongo decreed Gabon to be a one-party state and changed the name of the Gabonese Independence Party, the Bloc Democratique Gabonais (BDG), to the Parti Democratique Gabonais (PDG). In the 1973 elections for the national assembly and the presidency, Bongo was the sole candidate for president. He and all PDG candidates were elected by 99.56% of the votes cast. In April 1975 Bongo abolished the post of vice-president and appointed his former vice-president, Léon Mébiame, as prime minister, a position Bongo had held concurrently with his presidency from 1967. Mebiame would remain as prime minister until his resignation in 1990.

In addition to the presidency, Bongo held several ministerial portfolios from 1967 onward, including Minister of Defense (1967–1981), Information (1967–1980), Planning (1967–1977), Prime Minister (1967–1975), the Interior (1967–1970), and many others. Following a Congress of the PDG in January 1979 and the December 1979 elections, Bongo gave up some of his ministerial portfolios and surrendered his functions as head of government to Prime Minister Mebiame. The PDG congress had criticized Bongo's administration for inefficiency and called for an end to the holding of multiple offices. Bongo was again re-elected for a seven-year term in 1979, receiving 99.96% of the popular vote.

Opposition to President Bongo's regime first appeared in the late 1970s, as economic difficulties became more acute for the Gabonese. The first organized, but illegal, opposition party was MORENA, the Movement for National Restoration (Mouvement de redressement national). This moderate opposition group sponsored demonstrations by students and academic staff at the Universite Omar Bongo in Libreville in December 1981, when the university was temporarily closed. MORENA accused Bongo of corruption and personal extravagance and of favoring his own Bateke tribe; the group demanded that a multi-party system be restored. Arrests were made in February 1982, when the opposition distributed leaflets criticizing the Bongo regime during a visit by Pope John Paul II. In November 1982, 37 MORENA members were tried and convicted of offenses against state security. Severe sentences were handed out, including 20 years of hard labor for 13 of the defendants; all were pardoned, however, and released by mid-1986.

Despite these pressures, Omar Bongo remained committed to one-party rule. In 1985, legislative elections were held which followed past procedures; all nominations were approved by PDG, which then presented a single list of candidates. The candidates were ratified by popular vote on 3 March 1985. In November 1986 Bongo was re-elected by 99.97% of the popular vote.

Multi-party rule
On 22 May 1990, after strikes, riots and unrest, the PDG central committee and the National Assembly approved constitutional amendments to facilitate the transition to a multi-party system. The existing presidential mandate, effective through 1994, was to be respected. Subsequent elections to the presidency would be contested by more than one candidate, and the presidential term of office was changed to five years with a term limit consisting of one re-election to the office.

The next day, 23 May 1990, a vocal critic of Bongo and the leading political opposition leader, Joseph Rendjambe, was found dead in a hotel, reportedly murdered by poison. The death of Rendjambe, a prominent business executive and secretary-general of the opposition group Parti gabonais du progres (PGP), touched off the worst rioting in Bongo's 23-year rule. Presidential buildings in Libreville were set on fire and the French consul-general and ten oil company employees were taken hostage. French troops evacuated foreigners and a state of emergency was declared in Port Gentil, Rendjambe's hometown and a strategic oil production site. Bongo threatened to withdraw their exploration licenses unless they restored normal output, which they soon did. France sent in 500 troops to reinforce the 500-man battalion of Marines permanently stationed in Gabon "to protect the interests of 20,000 resident French nationals". Tanks and troops were deployed around the presidential palace to halt rioters.

In December 1993, Bongo won the first presidential election held under the new multi-party constitution, by a considerably narrower margin of around 51.4%. Opposition candidates refused to validate the election results. Serious civil disturbances led to an agreement between the government and opposition factions to work toward a political settlement. These talks led to the Paris Accords in November 1994, under which several opposition figures were included in a government of national unity. This arrangement soon broke down, however, and the 1996 and 1997 legislative and municipal elections provided the backdrop for renewed partisan politics. The PDG won a landslide victory in the legislative election, but several major cities, including Libreville, elected opposition mayors during the 1997 local election. Bongo was eventually successful in consolidating power again, with most of the major opposition leaders being either co-opted by being given high-ranking posts in the government or bought off, ensuring his comfortable re-election in 1998.

In 2003, Bongo secured a change in the Constitution allowing him to seek re-election as many times as he wanted, and changing the Presidential term to seven years, up from five. Bongo's critics accused him of intending to rule for life. On 27 November 2005 Bongo won a seven-year term as president, receiving 79.2 percent of the vote, comfortably ahead of his four challengers. He was sworn in for another seven-year term on 19 January 2006 and remained president until his death in 2009.

Relations with France
French culture, economy, and polity have long dominated the small African country of Gabon. The French control of the colonial era ... has been replaced, since independence in 1960, by an insidious rapprochement with Paris, fashioned by Gabon's leadership. A French journalist long familiar with the continent wrote that "Gabon is an extreme case, verging on caricature, of neocolonialism. Bongo's international relations and affairs were dominated by his, and by extension Gabon's, relations with France, Gabon falling within the ambit of Françafrique. With its oil, a fifth of the world's known uranium (Gabonese uranium supplied France's nuclear bombs, which French president Charles de Gaulle tested in the Algerian deserts in 1960), big iron and manganese deposits, and plenty of timber, Gabon was always important to France. Bongo reportedly said: "Gabon without France is like a car with no driver. France without Gabon is like a car with no fuel..."

In 1964 when renegade soldiers arrested him in Libreville and kidnapped president M'ba, French paratroopers rescued the abducted president and Mr Bongo, restoring them to power. Bongo became Vice President in 1966 after what was effectively an interview and subsequent approval by then French President Gen. Charles de Gaulle in 1965 in Paris.

In 1988, the New York Times reported that "Last year, French aid to Gabon amounted to US$360 million. This included subsidizing a third of Gabon's budget, extending low-interest trade loans, paying the salaries of 170 French advisers and 350 French teachers and paying scholarships for most of the roughly 800 Gabonese who study in France every year... [A]ccording to Le Canard enchaîné, a French opposition weekly, US$2.6 million of this aid also went for the interior decoration of a DC-8 jet belonging to President Bongo."

In 1990, France, which has always maintained a permanent military base in Gabon as well as in some of its other ex-colonies, helped maintain Bongo in power in the face of sustained pro-democracy protests that threatened to oust him from power. When Gabon found itself on the brink of a civil war after the first multiparty presidential elections in 1993, with the opposition staging violent protests, Paris hosted the talks between Bongo and the opposition, resulting in the Paris Agreement/Accords which restored calm.In France, his old ally, Mr. Bongo and his family lived in the rarefied air of the super-rich. At their disposal were 39 luxurious properties, 70 bank accounts and at least 9 luxury vehicles worth about US$2 million, according to Transparency International.... 
Former French president Valéry Giscard d'Estaing claimed that Bongo helped bankroll Jacques Chirac's 1981 presidential campaign. Giscard said Bongo had developed a "very questionable financial network" over time. "I called Bongo and told him 'you're supporting my rival's campaign' and there was a dead silence that I still remember to this day and then he said 'Ah, you know about it', which was extraordinary. From that moment on, I broke off personal relations with him", said Giscard. Socialist French parliamentarian André Vallini reportedly claimed that Bongo had bankrolled numerous French electoral campaigns, both Right and Left. In 2008, French President, Nicolas Sarkozy demoted his minister in charge of looking after the ex-colonies, Jean-Marie Bockel, after the latter noted the "squandering of public funds" by some African regimes, provoking Mr. Bongo's fury.He made his country and his oil industry available as a source of offshore slush funds", said political analyst Nicholas Shaxson, the author of a book on Africa's oil states. "These were used by all the French political parties — from the left to the right — for secret party financing, and as a source of bribes in support of French commercial bids all over the world.
After Bongo's demise, President Sarkozy expressed his "sadness and emotion" ... and pledged that France would remain "loyal to its long relationship of friendship" with Gabon. "It is a great and loyal friend of France who has left us — a grand figure of Africa," Sarkozy said in a statement.

Allegations of corruption

Italian fashion designer Francesco Smalto admitted providing Bongo with Parisian prostitutes to secure a tailoring business worth $600,000 per year.

Bongo was one of the wealthiest heads of state in the world, his wealth attributed primarily to oil revenue and alleged corruption. In 1999, an investigation by the US Senate Permanent Subcommittee on investigations into Citibank estimated that the Gabonese President held US$130 million in the bank's personal accounts, money the Senate report said was "sourced in the public finances of Gabon".

In 2005, an investigation by the United States Senate Indian Affairs Committee into fundraising irregularities by lobbyist Jack Abramoff revealed that Abramoff had offered to arrange a meeting between U.S. President George W. Bush and Bongo for the sum of US$9,000,000. Although such an exchange of funds remains unproven, Bush met with Bongo 10 months later in the Oval Office.

In 2007, his former daughter-in-law, Inge Lynn Collins Bongo, the second wife of his son Ali Bongo Ondimba, caused a stir when she appeared on the US music channel VH1's reality show, Really Rich Real Estate. She was featured trying to buy a US$25,000,000 mansion in Malibu, California.

Bongo was cited in recent years during French criminal inquiries into hundreds of millions of euros of illicit payments by Elf Aquitaine, the former French state-owned oil group. One Elf representative testified that the company was giving 50 million euros per year to Bongo to exploit the petrol lands of Gabon. As of June 2007, Bongo, along with President Denis Sassou Nguesso of the Republic of the Congo, Blaise Compaoré of Burkina Faso, Teodoro Obiang Nguema Mbasogo of Equatorial Guinea and José Eduardo dos Santos from Angola was being investigated by the French magistrates after the complaint made by French NGOs Survie and Sherpa due to claims that he has used millions of pounds of embezzled public funds to acquire lavish properties in France. The leaders all denied wrongdoing.

The Sunday Times (UK) reported on 20 June 2008 as follows:A mansion worth £15m in one of Paris's most elegant districts has become the latest of 33 luxury properties bought in France by President Omar Bongo Ondimba of Gabon ... a French judicial investigation has discovered that Bongo, 72, and his relatives also bought a fleet of limousines, including a £308,823 Maybach for his wife, Edith, 44. Payment for some of the cars was taken directly from the treasury of Gabon ... The Paris mansion is in the Rue de la Baume, near the Elysée Palace ... The  home was bought in June last year by a property company based in Luxembourg. The firm's partners are two of Bongo's children, Omar, 13, and Yacine, 16, his wife Edith and one of her nephews... [T]he residence is the most expensive in his portfolio, which includes nine other properties in Paris, four of which are on the exclusive Avenue Foch, near the Arc de Triomphe. He also rents a nine-room apartment in the same street. Bongo has a further seven properties in Nice, including four villas, one of which has a swimming pool. Edith has two flats near the Eiffel Tower and another property in Nice. Investigators identified the properties through tax records. Checks at Bongo's houses, in turn, allowed them to find details of his fleet of cars. Edith used a cheque, drawn on an account in the name of "Prairie du Gabon en France" (part of the Gabon treasury), to buy the Maybach, painted Côte d'Azur blue, in February 2004. Bongo's daughter Pascaline, 52, used a cheque from the same account for a part-payment of £29,497 towards a £60,000 Mercedes two years later. Bongo bought himself a Ferrari 612 Scaglietti F1 in October 2004 for £153,000 while his son Ali acquired a Ferrari 456 M GT in June 2001 for £156,000. Bongo's fortune has repeatedly come under the spotlight. According to a 1997 US Senate report, his family spends £55m a year. In a separate French investigation into corruption at the former oil giant Elf Aquitaine, an executive testified that it paid Bongo £40m a year via Swiss bank accounts in exchange for permission to exploit his country's reserves. Bongo denied this. The latest inquiry, by the French antifraud agency OCRGDF, followed a lawsuit that accused Bongo and two other African leaders of looting public funds to finance their purchases. 'Whatever the merits and qualifications of these leaders, no one can seriously believe that these assets were paid for out of their salaries', alleges the lawsuit brought by the Sherpa association of judges, which promotes corporate social responsibility.

In 2009, Bongo spent his last months in a major row with France over the French inquiry. A French court decision in February 2009 to freeze his bank accounts added fuel to the fire and his government accused France of waging a "campaign to destabilize" the country. It is for this reason that he was hospitalized and spent his last days in Barcelona, Spain and not in France.

Leadership style
[W]ith a neat mustache and piercing gaze often hidden behind dark glasses, he ruled....  He was a short man, like many of his minority Bateke ethnic group, and often wore raised platform shoes so as to appear taller... But his diminutive height belied his towering stature: on Gabon's political stage – which he ruled shrewdly for nearly 42 years -; and on the African continent, as one of the last of the so-called "big men".

Omar Bongo, Africa's "little Big Man", described as "a diminutive, dapper figure who conversed in flawless French, a charismatic figure surrounded by a personality cult", was one of the last of the African "Big Man" rulers. The pillars of his long rule were France, revenues from Gabon's  of oil reserves, and his political skills.

An ardent Francophile, Bongo was at the inception of his Presidency happy to strike a favorable bargain with the old colonial power, France. He gave the French oil company, Elf Aquitaine, privileged rights to exploit Gabon's oil reserves while Paris returned the favor by guaranteeing his grip on power for the indefinite future.

Bongo went on to preside over an oil boom that undoubtedly fueled an extravagant lifestyle for him and his family—dozens of luxurious properties in and around France, a US$800 million presidential palace in Gabon, fancy cars, etc. This enabled him to amass enough wealth to become one of the world's richest men. He carefully allowed just enough oil money to trickle down to the general population of 1.4 million, thus avoiding mass unrest. He built some basic infrastructure in Libreville and, ignoring advice to establish a road network instead, constructed the US$4bn Trans-Gabon Railway line deep into the forested interior. Petrodollars funded the salaries of a bloated civil service, spreading enough of the state's wealth among the population to keep most of them fed and dressed. Gabon under Bongo was described in 2008 by the UK Guardian newspaper:Gabon produces some sugar, beer and bottled water. Despite the rich soil and tropical climate, there is only a tiny amount of agricultural production. Fruit and vegetables arrive on trucks from Cameroon. Milk is flown in from France.  And years of dependence on relatives with civil service jobs means that many Gabonese have no interest in seeking work outside the state sector – most manual jobs are taken by immigrants.

Bongo used part of the money to build up a fairly large circle of people who supported him such as government ministers, high administrators, and army officers. He had learned from Léon M'ba how to give government ministries to different tribal groups so that someone from every important group had a representative in the government. Bongo had no ideology beyond self-interest, but there was no opposition with an ideology either. He ruled by knowing how the self-interest of others could be manipulated. He was skilled at persuading opposition figures to become his allies. He offered critics modest slices of the nation's oil wealth, co-opting or buying off opponents rather than crushing them outright. He became the most successful of all Africa's Francophone leaders, comfortably extending his political dominance into the fifth decade.

When multi-party presidential elections were held in 1993, which he won, the poll was marred by allegations of rigging, with the opposition claiming that chief rival, Father Paul Mba Abessole, was robbed of victory. Gabon found itself on the brink of a civil war, as the opposition staged violent demonstrations. Determined to prove that he was not a dictator who relied on brute force for his political survival, Bongo entered into talks with the opposition, negotiating what became known as the Paris Agreement. When Bongo won the second presidential elections held in 1998, similar controversy raged over his victory. The president responded by meeting some of his critics to discuss revising legislation to guarantee free and fair elections. After Bongo's Gabonese Democratic Party scored a landslide victory in the 2001 legislative elections, Bongo offered government posts to influential opposition members. Father Abessole accepted a ministerial post in the name of "friendly democracy".

The main opposition leader, Pierre Mamboundou of the Gabonese People's Union, refused to attend the post 1998 elections meetings, claiming that they were merely a ploy by Bongo to lure opposition leaders. Mamboundou called for a boycott of the legislative elections held in December 2001, and his supporters burned ballot boxes and papers in a polling station in his hometown of Ndende. He then rejected offers for a senior post after the 2001 legislative elections. But despite threats from Bongo, Mamboundou was never arrested. The president declared that a "policy of forgiveness" was his "best revenge". "In 2006, however, Maboundou, stopped his public criticisms of Mr. Bongo. The former brand made no secret that the president pledged to give him US$21.5 million for the development of his constituency of Ndende". As time went on, Bongo depended on more and more on his close family members. By 2009, his son Ali by his first wife had been the Minister of Defense since 1999, while  his daughter, Pascaline, was the head of the President's administration and her husband the Minister of Foreign Affairs, Paul Toungui.

In 2000, he put an end to a student strike by providing about US$1.35m for the purchase of the computers and books they were demanding. "[He] was a self-proclaimed nature lover in a country with the largest percentage of the untrammeled virgin jungle of all the nations in the Congo Basin. In 2002, he set aside 10 percent of Gabon's land as national parks, pledging that they would never be logged, mined, hunted or farmed." He was not beyond some measure of self-aggrandisement, "thus, Gabon acquired Bongo University, Bongo Airport, numerous Bongo Hospitals, Bongo Stadium and Bongo Gymnasium. The president's hometown, Lewai, was inevitably renamed Bongoville."

On the international stage, Bongo cultivated an image as a mediator, playing a pivotal role in attempts to solve the crises in the Central African Republic, Republic of the Congo, Burundi and the Democratic Republic of Congo. In 1986, Bongo's image was boosted abroad when he received the Dag Hammarskjold Peace Prize for efforts to resolve the Chad-Libya border conflict. He was  popular among his own people as his reign had guaranteed peace and stability. Under Mr. Bongo's rule, Gabon never had a coup or a civil war, a rare achievement for a nation surrounded by unstable, war-torn states. Fueled by oil, the country's economy was more like that of an Arabian emirate than a Central African nation. For many years Gabon was said, perhaps apocryphally, to have the world's highest per capita consumption of Champagne.

According to the political scientist Thomas Atenga, despite the large oil revenues, "the Gabonese rentier state has functioned for years on the predation of resources for the benefit of its ruling class, around which a parasitic capitalism has developed that has hardly improved the living conditions of the population".

Personal life

Bongo converted to Islam and took the name Omar while on a visit to Libya in 1973. At the time Muslims constituted a tiny minority of the native population; following Bongo's conversion the numbers grew, although they remained a small minority. He added Ondimba as a surname on 15 November 2003 in recognition of his father, Basile Ondimba, who died in 1942.

Bongo's first marriage was to Louise Mouyabi-Moukala. They had a daughter, Pascaline, born at Franceville in 1957. Pascaline was Gabon's Foreign Minister and subsequently Director of the Presidential Cabinet.

Bongo's second marriage was to Marie Josephine Kama, later known as Josephine Bongo. He divorced her in 1987, after which she went on to launch a music career under a new name, Patience Dabany. They had a son, Alain Bernard Bongo, and a daughter, Albertine Amissa Bongo. Born at Brazzaville in 1959, Alain Bernard Bongo (later known as Ali-Ben Bongo) served as Foreign Minister from 1989 to 1992, then as Defence Minister from 1999 to 2009, and was then elected President in August 2009 to replace his father.

Bongo then married Edith Lucie Sassou-Nguesso, nearly 30 years his junior, in 1989. She was the daughter of Congolese President Denis Sassou-Nguesso. She was a trained pediatrician, known for her commitment to fighting AIDS. She bore Bongo two children. Edith Lucie Bongo died on 14 March 2009, four days after her 45th birthday in Rabat, Morocco, where she had been undergoing treatment for several months. The statement announcing her death did not specify the cause of death or the nature of her illness. She had not appeared in public for around three years preceding her death. She was buried on 22 March 2009 in the family cemetery in the northern town of Edou, in her native Congo.

In all, Bongo had more than 30 children with his wives and other women.

Bongo did also have some measure of scandal. In 2004, The New York Times reported that:Peru is investigating claims that a beauty pageant contestant was lured to Gabon to become the lover of its 67-year-old president, Omar Bongo, and was stranded for nearly two weeks after she refused. A spokesman for Mr. Bongo said he was unaware of the allegations. The Peruvian Foreign Ministry said that Ivette Santa Maria, a 22-year-old Miss Peru America contestant, was invited to Gabon to be a hostess for a pageant there. In an interview, Ms. Santa Maria said that she was taken to Mr. Bongo's presidential palace hours after her Jan. 19 arrival and that as he joined her, he pressed a button and some sliding doors opened, revealing a large bed. She said, I told him I was not a prostitute, that I was a Miss Peru. She fled and guards offered to drive her to a hotel. Without money to pay the bill, however, she was stranded in Gabon for 12 days until international women's groups and others intervened.

Honours

National honours
:
 Grand Cross of the Order of the Equatorial Star
 Grand Cross of the National Order of Merit

Foreign honours
:
 Grand Cross of the National Order of Legion of Honour
:
 Grand Collar of the Order of Sikatuna

Illness and death

On 7 May 2009, the Gabonese Government announced that Bongo had temporarily suspended his official duties and taken time off to mourn his wife and rest in Spain.

International media, however, reported that he was seriously ill, and undergoing treatment for cancer in hospital in Barcelona, Spain. The Gabonese government maintained that he was in Spain for a few days of rest following the "intense emotional shock" of his wife's death, but eventually admitted that he was in a Spanish clinic "undergoing a medical check up".

On 7 June 2009, unconfirmed reports quoting French media and citing sources "close to the French government" reported that Bongo had died in Spain of complications from advanced cancer. The Government of Gabon denied the reports, which had been picked up by numerous other news sources, and continued to insist that he was well. His death was eventually confirmed by then Gabonese Prime Minister Jean Eyeghe Ndong, who said in a written statement that Bongo had died of a heart attack shortly before 12:30 GMT on 8 June 2009.

Bongo's body was flown back to Gabon, where it lay in state for five days, as thousands of people came to pay their respects. A state funeral followed on 16 June 2009 in Libreville which was attended by nearly two dozen African heads of state, including several of the continent's strongmen who themselves have ruled for decades, and by Nicolas Sarkozy and Jacques Chirac—the current and former French presidents (and the only Western heads of state to attend).

Bongo's body was then flown to Franceville, the main town in the southeastern province of Haut-Ogooue, where he was born, where he was buried in a private family burial on 18 June 2009.

See also
 Tokyo International Conference on African Development (TICAD-IV), 2008.

References

External links

 Omar Bongo's Official Presidential Facebook page
 "Omar Bongo's Demise Should Awaken Continent's Tyrants" by Arthur Asiimwe, New Times, 10 June 2009

|-

|-

Bongo, Omar
2009 deaths
People from Haut-Ogooué Province
Gabonese Muslims
Gabonese Democratic Party politicians
Presidents of Gabon
Vice presidents of Gabon
Prime Ministers of Gabon
Converts to Islam
Deaths from cancer in Spain
Teke
20th-century politicians
21st-century Gabonese politicians
Gabonese former Christians
Recipients of the Olympic Order
French Air and Space Force personnel
21st-century Gabonese people